Khylin Rhambo (born January 8, 1996) is an American actor. He is best known for his roles as Charles Johnson on the television sitcom The First Family and as Mason Hewitt on MTV's show Teen Wolf.

Early life

Rhambo started out his career at an early age. He modelled for various products such as Lee Jeans, Hasbro, Disney and Mattel Toys, before becoming interested in acting at the age of 8 and attending acting classes. After quickly gaining recognition by several talent agents who attended some of his acting classes, Rhambo booked work on several regional commercials.

Career

Rhambo's first casting role came when he was cast as a guest star on the BET show Reed Between the Lines and later booked another guest star role on Criminal Minds. In 2013, he was cast in his first feature-film, the sci-fi thriller Ender's Game as Dink Meeker.

In 2014, Rhambo was cast in the role he is most known for, Mason Hewitt, in the MTV show Teen Wolf.

In September 2021, it was announced that a reunion film for 2011 Teen Wolf television series had been ordered by Paramount+, with Jeff Davis returning as a screenwriter and executive producer for the film. The majority of the original cast members, including Rhambo himself, will reprise their roles. The film was released on January 26, 2023.

Filmography

Film

Television

References

External links
 
 
 

1996 births
Living people
21st-century American male actors
American male film actors
American male television actors
African-American male actors
Male actors from California
21st-century African-American people